Woodland Hills Academy is a historic school in Turtle Creek, Pennsylvania. It is part of the Woodland Hills School District. It was built in 1917 as the Turtle Creek High School. In 2009, the school re-opened as the Woodland Hills Academy; it currently serves grades K–8.

The building was added to the National Register of Historic Places on August 30, 2007, and the List of Pittsburgh History and Landmarks Foundation Historic Landmarks in 2009.

Notable alumni
 Leon Hart, football player, Heisman Trophy winner and tight end for 1957 NFL champion Detroit Lions
 William McMillan, Olympic gold medalist.
 The Vogues

References

School buildings on the National Register of Historic Places in Pennsylvania
Schools in Allegheny County, Pennsylvania
School buildings completed in 1917
Neoclassical architecture in Pennsylvania
Pittsburgh History & Landmarks Foundation Historic Landmarks
National Register of Historic Places in Allegheny County, Pennsylvania
2009 establishments in Pennsylvania